The Bangsamoro Darul Ifta' (BDI-BARMM) is an Islamic advisory council which has jurisdiction over the Bangsamoro Autonomous Region in Muslim Mindanao.

History
The Regional Darul Ifta (RDI) of Bangsamoro was created during the existence of the Autonomous Region in Muslim Mindanao. Then-ARMM Regional Governor Mujiv Hataman institutionalized Islamic jurisconsult in the region when he issued Executive Order 9, series of 2014 in September 2013 which created a transitional office of the jurisconsult that would oversee religious activities in ARMM as well as the propagation of Islam. The office was a temporary one with the Regional Legislative Assembly considering to establish a permanent jurisconsult body.

The Muslim Mindanao Autonomy Act No. 323 signed by Governor Hataman in 2015 superseded Executive Order 9. The legislation established the Regional Darul Ifta' of the Autonomous Region in Muslim Mindanao as the Islamic religious authority in the region to deal with issues and concerns of the region's Muslim population. The implementing rules and regulations (IRR) for the legislation establishing the RDI became effective in March 2017.

The Islamic body remained extant when the ARMM was succeeded by the Bangsamoro Autonomous Region in Muslim Mindanao (BARMM).

Function
The Darul Ifta of Bangsamoro's primary role is the promulgation and issuance of fatwa or legal opinions concerning Muslim personal laws as well as jurisprudence with the Article VIII, Section 20 of Republic Act 9054 as the basis for this function. Republic Act 9054 tackles the expansion of the Organic Act of the ARMM. The jurisconsult body also has an advisory role, serving as a consultant to the Bangsamoro regional government in affairs related to Islamic laws, jurisprudence and ecclesiastical matters as well as the religious guide for the region's politicians, government employees and professionals.

Structure
The Muslim Mindanao Autonomy Act No. 323 mandates the establishment of provincial offices in the then-extant ARMM which should be headed by a provincial mufti selected among the resident Ulama of the relevant province.

References

Government in Bangsamoro
Islamic organizations based in the Philippines
Fatwas